Gemini Movies (previously known as Teja TV) is an Indian Telugu language pay television movies channel. It is a part of the Sun TV Network and was launched in May 2000 under the name Teja TV. In October 2010, Teja TV was renamed as Gemini Movies. It is the sister channel of the general entertainment channel Gemini TV. 

Initial programming of Teja TV focused on movies but also included news-based productions like crime reports, investigative programs, interviews with famous personalities, live coverage of the Andhra Pradesh assembly proceedings.

Gemini Movies has a library of over 2900 films, including many popular Telugu films, often shared with Gemini TV. It also telecasts film-based discussions and interviews, songs, film news, concerts, and other film events. Its HD version, Gemini Movies HD was launched on 15 March 2017.

External links

Telugu-language television channels
Movie channels in India
Television channels and stations established in 1993
Sun Group
Television stations in Hyderabad